The Schippersgracht is a canal and street in the Centrum district of Amsterdam that runs from the Rapenburgerplein to the Prins Hendrikkade.

Location

The Schippersgracht street starts where Foeliedwarsstraat crosses Rapenburgerplein and ends at the Kortjewantsbrug (bridge 487) on Prins Hendrikkade. 
The quay along the north-west side of the water has the house numbers 2 to 16, with even and odd numbers alternating (not opposite each other). 
In the past there were higher house numbers, up to 423. 
The current numbering began in the 19th century. 
The southeastern bank of the canal is called Kadijksplein. 
The Schippersgracht owes its name to the fact that many skippers lived here.

Architecture

There are a number of monumental buildings from the 17th century on Schippersgracht, including numbers 14 and 15. 
The Amsterdam architect Herman Hendrik Baanders (1849–1905) designed Schippersgracht 5 (1897). Baanders was mainly active in Amsterdam.

History 

In April 1854 the Amsterdamsche Duinwater-Maatschappij started installation of drinking water on the Schippersgracht. 
Around 1906 the end of tram line 2 was on the Schippersgracht.
This was canceled after six months and shortened to Central Station.

See also 
Canals of Amsterdam

Notes

Sources

Canals in Amsterdam